Elophila roesleri is a moth in the family Crambidae. It was described by Speidel in 1984. It is found in China (Yunnan).

References

Acentropinae
Moths described in 1984
Moths of Asia